Evelino Pidò (born 1953 in Torino) is an Italian conductor. Acclaimed for his Bellini and Donizetti interpretations, he has served as conductor of the Lyon Opera. Gramophone said "Evelino Pido is a specialist in this repertory [Donizetti] and he leads the Geneva forces in a well balanced account of what many people consider Donizetti's masterpiece."

External links 
 Pidò alla Scala

References

Italian male conductors (music)
Living people
21st-century Italian conductors (music)
21st-century Italian male musicians
1953 births
20th-century Italian conductors (music)
20th-century Italian male musicians
Musicians from Turin